This is the list of The Late Show with Stephen Colbert episodes that aired in 2023.

2023

January

February

March

References

External links
 
 Lineups at Interbridge 
 

Episodes 2023
Lists of American non-fiction television series episodes
Lists of variety television series episodes
Late Show with Stephen Colbert